Sunter may refer to:

People 

 Ercüment Sunter, Turkish basketball player
 Ian Sunter, Scottish-Canadian Canadian football player
 Thomas Sunter (1847–1901). British trade unionist.

Places 

 Sunter Island, Islands on the Great Barrier Reef
 Sunter, Jakarta, an area of North Jakarta, Indonesia.
 Sunter River in Jakarta, Indonesia.

Turkish-language surnames